Croesyceiliog (Cockerel's Cross) is a suburb of Cwmbran, Wales.

Housing 
Croesyceiliog is primarily a residential district and contains a wide variety of housing from Victorian terraces and even older Welsh cottages to property built between 1930 and 1970 and newer developments within the area. Most of the housing was built in the 1950s and 1960s as part of the development of Cwmbran New Town.

Facilities 

The former Gwent County Hall was located in Croesyceiliog. Until 2012 it provided the main administrative base for Monmouthshire County Council (even though it was outside that administrative area) and Gwent Police, and some offices for Torfaen County Borough Council.  The demolition of the premises was required as a result of concrete cancer, and took place in 2013.

There are shops, takeaways, pubs, hairdressers and a doctors' surgery in the main shopping areas of Edlogan Square, the Highway and North Road.

There are two schools, Croesyceiliog Comprehensive School, and a primary school on North Road (Croesyceiliog Primary School).

There is a Baptist chapel on Chapel Lane, Pontrhydyrun Baptist Church and an Anglican church named St Mary's Church on Bryn Eglwys (literally 'Church Hill').

Croesyceiliog Cricket and Rugby Club is on the Highway. Croesyceiliog Cricket Club currently play in the Glamorgan and Monmouthshire League, while Croesyceiliog Rugby Club play in the Welsh Division Three East League.  Croesyceiliog also has a lawn bowls team which play at Woodland Road Sports Grounds.

Woodland Road Park is a recreation area which contains a bowling green, rugby pitch, tennis courts, outdoor paddling pool and adventure playground.

The Croesyceiliog bypass was built in the 1960s and forms part of the main A4042 road between Newport and Abergavenny. Before the bypass was opened the A4042 went through Croesyceiliog.

Census data
At the 2011 Census the following information was captured:

Population 5,246 (Torfaen 91,075)
47.7% male, 52.3% female
Age structure
15.6% aged 0–15
31.8% aged 16–44
20.0% aged 45–59
32.6% aged 60+

Electoral wards
For elections, Croesyceiliog is split into two electoral wards: Croesyceiliog North and Croesyceiliog South.
For elections to the UK parliament, both wards are part of the constituency of Monmouth.
For elections to the Senedd, both wards are part of the constituency of Monmouth.
For elections to Torfaen County Borough Council, Croesyceiliog North returns 2 councillors, and Croesyceiliog South returns 1 councillor.
For elections to Croesyceiliog and Llanyrafon Community Council, Croesyceiliog North returns 6 councillors, and Croesyceiliog South returns 2 councillors.

People from Croesyceiliog 
 Terry Cooper (footballer, born 1950)
 Dan Thomas (rugby player)
 Mary White (ceramicist and calligrapher) (1926–2013)
 Lenny Woodard (rugby)

See also

Cwmbran
Torfaen
Communities of Torfaen

References

External links 
Croesyceiliog Community Council website
Croesyceiliog Cricket Club
Croesyceiliog Canoe Club
Pontrhydyrun Baptist Church
St Mary's Church, Croesyceiliog

Communities in Torfaen
Suburbs of Cwmbran
Electoral wards of Torfaen